Royal Prussian Jagdstaffel 65, commonly abbreviated to Jasta 65, was a "hunting group" (i.e., fighter squadron) of the Luftstreitkräfte, the air arm of the Imperial German Army during World War I. The squadron would score 34 aerial victories during the war, including nine observation balloons downed. The unit's victories came at the expense of six pilots killed in action, two wounded in action, and two taken prisoner of war.

History
Jasta 65 was founded on 23 January 1918. On February 4, it began operations. The new squadron began service with 5 Armee. On 6 May 1918, it was posted to Armee-Abteilung C. It would finish the war with this army.

Commanding officers (Staffelführer)
 Hellmuth Contag: ca 23 January 1918 -  6 March 1918
 Arno Benzler: 6 March 1918 - 19 March 1918
 Otto Fitzner: 19 March 1918 - war's end

Duty stations
 Stenay, France
 Mars-la-Tour, France: 6 May 1918
 Prentin: 15 July 1918
 Las Baraques: 18 July 1918
 Marville, France: 16 September 1918
 La Ferte, France: 6 October 1918
 Tichémont: 20 October 1918

References

Bibliography
 

65
Military units and formations established in 1918
1918 establishments in Germany
Military units and formations disestablished in 1918